The Python programming language is actively used by many people, both in industry and academia, for a wide variety of purposes.

Integrated Development Environments (IDEs) for Python

 Atom, an open source cross-platform IDE with autocomplete, help and more Python features under package extensions.
 EasyEclipse, an open source IDE for Python and other languages.
 Eclipse ,with the Pydev plug-in. Eclipse supports many other languages as well.
 Emacs, with the built-in python-mode.
 Eric, an IDE for Python and Ruby
 Geany, IDE for Python development and other languages.
IDLE, a simple IDE bundled with the default implementation of the language.
Jupyter Notebook, an IDE that supports markdown, Python, Julia, R and several other languages. 
 Komodo IDE an IDE PHOTOS Python, Perl, PHP and Ruby.
 NetBeans, is written in Java and runs everywhere where a JVM is installed.
 Ninja-IDE, free software, written in Python and Qt, Ninja name stands for Ninja-IDE Is Not Just Another IDE
 PIDA, open source IDE written in Python capable of embedding other text editors, such as Vim.
 PyCharm, a proprietary and Open Source IDE for Python development.
 PyScripter, Free and open-source software Python IDE for Microsoft Windows.
 PythonAnywhere, an online IDE and Web hosting service.
 Python Tools for Visual Studio, Free and open-source plug-in for Visual Studio.
 Spyder, IDE for scientific programming.
 Vim, with "lang#python" layer enabled.
 Visual Studio Code, an Open Source IDE for various languages, including Python.
 Wing IDE, cross-platform proprietary with some free versions/licenses IDE for Python.
 Replit, an online IDE that supports multiple languages.

Unit testing frameworks

Python package managers and Python distributions
 Anaconda, Python distribution with conda package manager
 Enthought, Enthought Canopy Python with Python package manager
 pip, package management system used to install and manage software written in Python

Applications
 A-A-P, a tool used to download, build and install software via Makefile-like "recipes"
 Anaconda (installer), an open-source system installer for Linux distributions primarily used in Fedora Linux, CentOS, and Red Hat Enterprise Linux.
 Anki, a spaced repetition flashcard program
 Ansible, a configuration management engine for computers by combining multi-node software deployment and ad hoc task execution
 Bazaar, a free distribution deed revision computer control system
 BitBake, a make-like build tool with the special focus of distributions and packages for embedded Linux cross compilation
 BitTorrent, original client, along with several derivatives
 Buildbot, a continuous integration system
 Buildout, a software build tool, primarily used to download and set up development or deployment software dependencies
 Calibre, an open source e-book management tool
 Celery, an asynchronous task queue/job queue based on distributed message passing
 Chandler, a personal information manager including calendar, email, tasks and notes support that is not currently under development
 Cinema 4D, a 3D art and animation program for creating intros and 3-Dimensional text. Has a built in Python scripting console and engine.
 Conch, implementation of the Secure Shell (SSH) protocol with Twisted
 Deluge, a ça BitTorrent client for GNOME
 Dropbox, a web-based file hosting service
 Exaile, an open source audio player
 Gajim, an instant messaging client for the XMPP protocol
 GlobaLeaks, an open-source whistleblowing framework
GNOME Soundconverter, a program for converting sound files to various formats and qualities (wrapper around GStreamer).
 Gramps, an open source genealogy software
 Gunicorn, a pre-fork web server for WSGI applications
 GYP (Generate Your Projects), a build automation tool (similar to CMake and Premake) designed to generate native IDE project files (e.g., Visual Studio, Xcode, etc.) from a single configuration
 Image Packaging System (IPS), an advanced, cross-platform package management system primarily used in Solaris and OpenSolaris/illumos derivatives
 Juice, a popular podcast downloader
 Mercurial a cross-platform, distributed source management tool
 Miro, a cross-platform internet television application
 Morpheus, a file-sharing client/server software operated by the company StreamCast
 MusicBrainz Picard, a cross-platform MusicBrainz tag editor
 Nicotine, a PyGTK Soulseek client
 OpenLP, lyrics projection software
 OpenShot Video Editor
 OpenStack, a cloud computing IaaS platform
 Pip, a package manager used to install and manage Python software packages such as those from the Python Package Index (PyPI) software repository
 PiTiVi, a non-linear video editor
 Portage, the heart of Gentoo Linux, an advanced package management system based on the BSD-style ports system
 Pungi (software), an open-source distribution compose tool for orchestrating the creation of YUM and system image repositories
Pychess, a cross-platform computer chess program
 Quake Army Knife, an environment for developing 3D maps for games based on the Quake engine
 Quod Libet, a cross-platform free and open source music player, tag editor and library organizer
 Resolver One, a spreadsheet
 SageMath, a combination of more than 20 main opensource math packages and provides easy to use web interface with the help of Python
 Salt, a configuration management and remote execution engine
 SCons, a tool for building software
 Shinken, a computer system and network monitoring software application compatible with Nagios
TouchDesigner, a node based visual programming language for real time interactive multimedia content
 Tryton, a three-tier high-level general purpose computer application platform
 Ubuntu Software Center, a graphical package manager, was installed by default in Ubuntu 9.10, and stopped being included in Ubuntu releases starting with the Ubuntu 16.04 release. 
 Wicd, a network manager for Linux
 YUM, a package management utility for RPM-compatible Linux operating systems
 Waf, a build automation tool designed to assist in the automatic compilation and installation of computer software
 Xpra, a tool which runs X clients, typically on a remote host, and directs their display to the local machine without losing any state

Web applications
 Allura, an ASF software forge for managing source code repositories, bug reports, discussions, wiki pages, blogs and more for multiple projects
 Bloodhound, an ASF project management and bug tracking system
 ERP5, a powerful open source ERP / CRM used in Aerospace, Apparel, Banking and for e-government
 ERPNext, an open source ERP / CRM
 Kallithea, a source code management system
 Mailman, one of the more popular packages for running email mailing lists
 MakeHuman, free software for creating realistic 3D humans.
 MoinMoin, a wiki engine
 Odoo (formerly OpenERP), business management software
 Planet, a feed aggregator
 Plone, an open source content management system
 Roundup, a bug tracking system
 Tor2web, an HTTP proxy for Tor Hidden Services (HS)
 Trac, web-based bug/issue tracking database, wiki, and version control front-end
 ViewVC, a web-based interface for browsing CVS and SVN repositories

Video games
 Battlefield 2 uses Python for all of its add-ons and a lot of its functionality.
 Bridge Commander
 Disney's Toontown Online is written in Python and uses Panda3D for graphics.
 Doki Doki Literature Club!, a psychological horror visual novel using the Ren'Py engine
 Eve Online uses Stackless Python.
 Frets on Fire is written in Python and uses Pygame
 Mount & Blade is written in Python.
 Pirates of the Caribbean Online is written in Python and uses Panda3D for graphics.
 SpongeBob SquarePants: Revenge of the Flying Dutchman uses Python as a scripting language.
 The Sims 4 uses Python
 The Temple of Elemental Evil, a computer role-playing game based on the classic Greyhawk Dungeons & Dragons campaign setting
 Unity of Command (video game) is an operational-level wargame about the 1942–43 Stalingrad Campaign on the Eastern Front.
 Vampire: The Masquerade – Bloodlines, a computer role-playing game based on the World of Darkness campaign setting
 Vega Strike, an open source space simulator, uses Python for internal scripting
 World of Tanks uses Python for most of its tasks.

Web frameworks

 BlueBream, a rewrite by the Zope developers of the Zope 2 web application server
 Bottle, A fast, simple and lightweight WSGI micro web framework
 CherryPy, an object-oriented web application server and framework
 CubicWeb, a web framework that targets large-scale semantic web and linked open data applications and international corporations
 Django, an MVT (model, view, template) web framework
 Flask, a modern, lightweight, well-documented microframework based on Werkzeug and Jinja 2
 Google App Engine,  a platform for developing and hosting web applications in Google-managed data centers, including Python.
 Grok, a web framework based on Zope Toolkit technology
 Jam.py (web framework), a "full stack" WSGI rapid application development framework
 Nagare, a web framework for developing web applications in Stackless Python
 Nevow, a web application framework originally developed by the company Divmod
 Pylons, a lightweight web framework emphasizing flexibility and rapid development
 Pyramid, is a minimalistic web framework inspired by Zope, Pylons and Django
 Python Paste, set of utilities for web development that has been described as "a framework for web frameworks"
 Quixote, a framework for developing Web applications in Python
 RapidSMS, a web framework which extends the logic and capabilities of Django to communicate with SMS messages
 Spyce, a technology to embed Python code into webpages
 TACTIC, a web-based smart process application and digital asset management system
 Tornado, a lightweight non-blocking server and framework
 TurboGears, a web framework combining SQLObject/SQLAlchemy, Kid/Genshi, and CherryPy/Pylons
 web2py, a full-stack enterprise web application framework, following the MVC design
 Zope 2, an application server, commonly used to build content management systems

Graphics frameworks
 Pygame, Python bindings for SDL
 Panda3D, a 3D game engine for Python
 Python Imaging Library, a module for working with images
 Python-Ogre, a Python Language binding for the OGRE 3D engine
 Soya3D, a high-level 3D game engine for Python

UI frameworks
 appJar, cross-platform, open source GUI library for Python. Provides easy wrapper functions around most of Tkinter with extra functionality built in.
 Kivy, open source Python library for developing multitouch application software with a natural user interface (NUI).
 PyGTK, a popular cross-platform GUI library based on GTK+; furthermore, other GNOME libraries also have bindings for Python
 PyQt, another cross-platform GUI library based on Qt; as above, KDE libraries also have bindings
 PySide, an alternative to the PyQt library, released under the BSD-style licence
 Tkinter is Python's de facto GUI it is shipped in most versions of Python and is integrated in the IDLE. It is based Tcl command tool.
 wxPython, a port of wxWidgets and a cross-platform GUI library for Python

Scientific packages
 Astropy, a library of Python tools for astronomy and astrophysics.
 Biopython, a Python molecular biology suite
 Gensim, a library for natural language processing, including unsupervised topic modeling and information retrieval
 graph-tool, a Python module for manipulation and statistical analysis of graphs.
 Natural Language Toolkit, or NLTK, a suite of libraries and programs for symbolic and statistical natural language processing (NLP) for English
 Orange, an open-source visual programming tool featuring interactive data visualization and methods for statistical data analysis, data mining, and machine learning.
 NetworkX, a package for the creation, manipulation, and study of complex networks.
 SciPy, collection of packages for mathematics, science, and engineering
 scikit-learn, a library for machine learning.
 TomoPy, a package for tomographic data processing and image reconstruction
 Veusz, a scientific plotting package
 VisTrails, a scientific workflow and provenance management software with visual programming interface and integrated visualization (via Matplotlib, VTK).
 Apache Singa, a library for deep learning.

Mathematical libraries
 CuPy, a library for GPU-accelerated computing
  Dask, a library for parallel computing
 Mathics, an open-source implementation of the Mathematica programming language
 Matplotlib, an extension providing MATLAB-like plotting and mathematical functions
 NumPy, a language extension that adds support for large and fast, multi-dimensional arrays and matrices
 Plotly is a scientific plotting library for creating browser-based graphs.
 SageMath is a large mathematical software application which integrates the work of nearly 100 free software projects.
 SymPy, a symbolic mathematical calculations package
 PyMC, python module containing Bayesian statistical models and fitting algorithms, including Markov chain Monte Carlo.

Numerical libraries

Additional development packages
  Beautiful Soup, a package for parsing HTML and XML documents
 Cheetah, a Python-powered template engine and code-generation tool
 Construct, a python library for the declarative construction and deconstruction of data structures
 Genshi, a template engine for XML-based vocabularies
 IPython, a development shell both written in and designed for Python
 Jinja, a Python-powered template engine, inspired by Django's template engine
 Kid, simple template engine for XML-based vocabularies
 Meson build system, a software tool for automating the building (compiling) of software
 mod_python, an Apache module allowing direct integration of Python scripts with the Apache web server
 PyObjC, a Python to Objective-C bridge that allows writing OS X software in Python
 Robot Framework, a generic test automation framework for acceptance testing and acceptance test-driven development (ATDD)
 Setuptools, a package development process library designed to facilitate packaging Python projects by enhancing the Python   (distribution utilities) standard library.
 Sphinx, which converts reStructuredText files into HTML websites and other formats including PDF, EPub and Man pages
 SQLAlchemy, database backend and ORM
 SQLObject, an ORM for providing an object interface to a database
 Storm, an ORM from Canonical
 Twisted, a networking framework for Python
 VPython, the Python programming language plus a 3D graphics module called Visual

Embedded as a scripting language
Python is, or can be used as the scripting language in these notable software products:

 Abaqus (Finite Element Software)
 ADvantage Framework
 Amarok
 ArcGIS, a prominent GIS platform, allows extensive modelling using Python
 Autodesk Maya, professional 3D modeler allows Python scripting as an alternative to MEL as of version 8.5
 Autodesk MotionBuilder
 Autodesk Softimage (formerly Softimage|XSI)
 BioNumerics a bioinformatics software suite for the management, storage and (statistical) analysis of all types of biological data. 
 Blender
 Boxee, a cross-platform home theater PC software
 Cinema 4D
 Civilization IV has the map editor supporting Python.
 Corel Paint Shop Pro
 Claws Mail with Python plugin
 DSHub
 ERDAS Imagine
 FreeCAD
 gedit
 GIMP
 GNAT The GNAT programming chain tool (Ada language implementation in GNU gcc), as a GNATcoll reusable components for the applications (with or without PyGTK) and as a scripting language for the commands in the GPS programming environment
 Houdini highly evolved 3D animation package, fully extensible using python
 Inkscape, a free vector graphics editor
 Krita, a free raster graphics editor for digital painting
 MeVisLab, a medical image processing and visualization software, uses Python for network scripting, macro modules, and application building
 Modo
 Micromine
 Minecraft: Pi Edition (game)
 MSC.Software's CAE packages: Adams, Mentat, SimXpert
 MySQL Workbench, a visual database design tool
 Notepad++ has a plugin named PythonScript that allows scripting Notepad++ in Python
 Nuke (compositing for visual effects)
 OriginPro, a commercial graphic and analysis software, provides Python environment for access
 ParaView, an opensource scientific visualization software
 Poser, a 3D rendering and animation computer program that uses for scripting a special dialect of Python, called PoserPython
 PTV AG products for traffic and transportation analysis, including PTV VISSIM
 PyMOL, a popular molecular viewer that embeds Python for scripting and integration
 OriginPro, a commercial graphing and analysis software, provides a Python environment for both embedded and external access
 QGIS uses Python for scripting and plugin-development
 Rhinoceros 3D version 5.0 and its visual-scripting language Grasshopper uses IronPython
 Rhythmbox
 Scribus
 3DSlicer, medical image visualisation and analysis software. Python is available for algorithm implementation, analysis pipelines, and GUI creation.
 SPSS statistical software SPSS Programmability Extension allows users to extend the SPSS command syntax language with Python
 SublimeText
 Totem, a media player for the GNOME desktop environment
 Vim
 VisIt
 WeeChat, a console IRC client

Commercial uses
 CCP Games uses Stackless Python in both its server-side and client-side applications for its MMO Eve Online.
 Instagram's backend is written in Python.
 NASA is using Python to implement a CAD/CAE/PDM repository and model management, integration, and transformation system which will be the core infrastructure for its next-generation collaborative engineering environment. It is also the development language for OpenMDAO, a framework developed by NASA for solving multidisciplinary design optimization problems.
 "Python has been an important part of Google since the beginning, and remains so as the system grows and evolves. Today dozens of Google engineers use Python."
 Reddit was originally written in Common Lisp, but was rewritten in Python in 2005
 Yahoo! Groups uses Python "to maintain its discussion groups"
 YouTube uses Python "to produce maintainable features in record times, with a minimum of developers"
 Enthought uses Python as the main language for many custom applications in Geophysics, Financial applications, Astrophysics, simulations for consumer product companies, ...
 Rosneft uses Python as one of the main languages for its geoengineering applications development. RN-GRID, a hydraulic fracturing simulation software, has a graphical user interface written entirely in Python.

Python implementations

Implementations of Python include:
 CLPython – Implementation, written in Common Lisp
 CPython – The reference implementation, written in C11. Some notable distributions include:
 ActivePython – Distribution with more than 300 included packages
 Intel Distribution for Python – High performance distribution with conda and pip package managers
 PSF Python – Reference distribution that includes only selected standard libraries
 Cython – programming language to simplify writing C and C++ extension modules for the CPython Python runtime.
 IronPython – Python for CLI platforms (including .NET and Mono)
 Jython – Python for Java platforms
 MicroPython – Python 3 implementation for microcontroller platforms
 Nuitka – a source-to-source compiler which compiles Python code to C/C++ executables, or source code.
 Numba – NumPy aware LLVM-based JIT compiler
 Pyjs – a framework (based on Google Web Toolkit (GWT) concept) for developing client-side Python-based web applications, including a stand-alone Python-to-JavaScript compiler, an Ajax framework and widget toolkit
 PyPy – Python (originally) coded in Python, used with RPython, a restricted subset of Python that is amenable to static analysis and thus a JIT.
 Shed Skin – a source-to-source compiler from Python to C++
 Stackless Python – CPython with coroutines

Historic Python implementations include:

 Parrot – Virtual machine being developed mainly as the runtime for Raku, and intended to support dynamic languages like Python, Ruby, Tcl, etc.
 Psyco – specialized JIT compiler project that has mostly been eclipsed by PyPy
 Pyrex – Python-like Python module development project that has mostly been eclipsed by Cython
 Python for S60 – CPython port to the S60 platform
 Unladen Swallow – performance-orientated implementation based on CPython which natively executed its bytecode via an LLVM-based JIT compiler. Funded by Google, stopped circa 2011

References

External links
 Python Package Index (formerly the Python Cheese Shop) is the official directory of Python software libraries and modules
 Popular Python recipes at ActiveState Code contains hundreds of code samples for various tasks using Python
 Useful Modules in the Python.org wiki
 Organizations Using Python – a list of projects that make use of Python
 Python.org editors – Multi-platform table of various Python editors
 Open Hub – open source projects in Python

 
Python (programming language)
Lists of software